Bryndioddef-isaf is a hamlet in the community of Llandyfriog, Ceredigion, Wales, which is 67.6 miles (108.8 km) from Cardiff and 189.1 miles (304.2 km) from London. Bryndioddef-isaf is represented in the Senedd by Elin Jones (Plaid Cymru) and is part of the Ceredigion constituency in the House of Commons.

References

See also 
 List of localities in Wales by population 

Villages in Ceredigion